Austrum is a rural locality (a selo) and the administrative centre of Austrumsky Selsoviet, Iglinsky District, Bashkortostan, Russia. The population was 535 as of 2010.

Geography 
Austrum is located 33 km east of Iglino (the district's administrative centre) by road. Kalininsky is the nearest rural locality.

References 

Rural localities in Iglinsky District